Hasan Üçüncü (born November 16, 1980) is a retired Turkish footballer. Üçüncü was born in Sürmene, Trabzon Province. Standing at 177 cm and weighing 74 kg, he wears the # 15 jersey and plays in the midfield position.  He assisted Gökdeniz Karadeniz's goal against Galatasaray in the second half of the 2005-2006 Süper Lig season, helping Gökdeniz come back from a long suspension.

Honours

Club
Trabzonspor
Turkish Cup: 2002–03

References

1980 births
Living people
People from Sürmene
Turkish footballers
Trabzonspor footballers
Akçaabat Sebatspor footballers
MKE Ankaragücü footballers
Giresunspor footballers
Çaykur Rizespor footballers
Mersin İdman Yurdu footballers
Turkey youth international footballers
Süper Lig players
Association football midfielders
Association football defenders